Roy Dotrice  (26 May 1923 – 16 October 2017) was a British actor famed for his portrayal of the antiquarian John Aubrey in the record-breaking solo play Brief Lives.

Abroad, he won a Tony Award for his performance in the 2000 Broadway revival of A Moon for the Misbegotten, also appearing as Wolfgang Amadeus Mozart's father Leopold in Amadeus (1984), Charles Dickens in Dickens of London (1984), and Jacob Wells/Father in Beauty and the Beast. Late in life, he narrated a series of audiobooks for George R. R. Martin's epic fantasy series A Song of Ice and Fire, for which he held the Guinness World Record for the most character voices for an audiobook by an individual.

Life and career
Dotrice was born in Guernsey, Bailiwick of Guernsey on 26 May 1923 to Neva (née Wilton; 1897–1984) and Louis Dotrice (1896–1991). He served as a wireless operator/air gunner with the Royal Air Force during the Second World War, and was imprisoned in a German prisoner of war camp from 1942 to 1945, after being shot down in Avro Manchester R5840 of No.106 Squadron based at Coningsby, all seven airmen of the crew being taken Prisoner of War.

Radio
Dotrice was the voice of "Permanent Under-Secretary Sir Gregory Pitkin" in the early episodes of BBC Radio's long-running comedy The Men from the Ministry. He was succeeded by Ronald Baddiley in the role. He also played the caretaker Ramsay alongside Patricia Hayes in the Radio 2 sitcom Know Your Place.

Theatre
Roy Dotrice was a distinguished member of the Royal Shakespeare Company and in the early 1960s played a variety of roles, including Caliban in The Tempest, opposite Tom Fleming's Propero (dir: Peter Brook) John of Gaunt and Hotspur opposite David Warner's Richard II, and Justice Shallow opposite Hugh Griffith as Falstaff in Henry IV, and then Edward IV in the Hall/Barton adapted Shakespeare cycle The Wars of the Roses, later broadcast by the BBC. Dotrice played the part of John Aubrey in Brief Lives, a one-man play devised and directed by Patrick Garland that saw Dotrice hold the stage for more than two-and-a-half hours (including the interval, during which he would feign sleep). Premiering in 1967 at the Hampstead Theatre in London, the play later toured England, before two successful productions on Broadway. In 1968 it moved to the Criterion Theatre in the West End, where it ran for 400 performances before transferring to the Mayfair Theatre. He revived the role in 2008, again under Patrick Garland's direction.

These runs, combined with extensive international touring, earned Dotrice a place in the Guinness World Records for the greatest number of solo performances (1,782). In 1984 he starred opposite Rosemary Harris in a production of Noël Coward's Hay Fever. He appeared in the stage production of Irving Berlin's White Christmas at The Lowry theatre in Salford from November 2009 to January 2010.

Television
In the 1970s Dotrice played the title role in the television mini-series Dickens of London. He also appeared as Albert Haddock in the BBC television adaptation of A. P. Herbert's Misleading Cases in 1971. In 1972 he played the Curé Ponosse in the BBC2 TV adaptation of Clochemerle (1972).

However, Dotrice was known to North American audiences as "Father" in the 1980s American TV series Beauty and the Beast and Father Gary Barrett, a Catholic priest, in the 1990s series Picket Fences. His acting career dates from 1945 in a revue called Back Home, performed by ex-POWs in aid of the Red Cross. In an episode of Angel (1999), part of the Buffyverse, he played the role of Roger Wyndam-Pryce, the overbearing father of the character Wesley Wyndam-Pryce. An earlier science-fiction role was Commissioner Simmonds in two episodes of the 1970s series Space: 1999. In 1998 Dotrice appeared in three episodes of the series Hercules: The Legendary Journeys as Zeus.

Dotrice was the subject of This Is Your Life in 1974 when he was surprised by Eamonn Andrews at Pinewood Studios.

Game of Thrones
In June 2010 it was announced that Dotrice would be playing the role of Grand Maester Pycelle in the HBO television series Game of Thrones, an adaptation of George R. R. Martin's A Song of Ice and Fire books. Dotrice later withdrew from the part for medical reasons and Julian Glover was cast in his place.

Shortly after filming for the second season commenced it was confirmed that Dotrice would be returning to play "Wisdom Hallyne the Pyromancer", who is featured in the installments "The Ghost of Harrenhal" and "Blackwater".

Radio and audiobooks
In 1982 BBC Radio 4 broadcast Dotrice's reading of fellow Guernseyman G.B. Edwards' classic novel The Book of Ebenezer Le Page in twenty-eight 15-minute parts on its Woman's Hour segment. The producer subsequently wrote that the serialisation was "without question the most popular serial I have ever done in the 500 or so I have produced in the last 21 years ...".

He subsequently performed "The Islander", a stage version of The Book of Ebenezer Le Page, to critical success at the Theatre Royal Lincoln. In 2012 AudioGO produced a complete and unabridged recording of Ebenezer Le Page, which is available on Audible.

Dotrice recorded audiobooks for each book in George R. R. Martin's series A Song of Ice and Fire. In 2011 he was awarded the world record for most character voices in an audiobook for his recording of A Game of Thrones, which contained 224.

Dotrice also narrated many storybook adaptations for Disney Records, including The Little Mermaid and Pooh's Heffalump, for which he was nominated for a Grammy Award.

Personal life and death
Dotrice was married to Kay Newman (1929–2007), a television and stage actress, from 1947 until her death in 2007. They had three daughters—Michele, Yvette and Karen—all of whom have acted at various times in their lives. He was the father-in-law of actors Edward Woodward (Michele) and Alex Hyde-White (Karen).

He particularly enjoyed baseball, fishing and football, and was a stalwart member of the Garrick Club. He was appointed Officer of the Order of the British Empire (OBE) in 2008.

Dotrice died at the age of 94 on 16 October 2017 in London; no cause was given. His body was cremated.

Select filmography

Film and television

The Adventure (TV film,1957) - Sailor
Treasure Island (TV miniserie, 1957) - Abe Gray 
 A Midsummer Night's Dream (TV film, 1959) -  Egeus
 The Heroes of Telemark (1965) – Jensen
 A.P. Herbert's 'Misleading Cases'
TV sitcom BBC One 1967 - 1971 19 episodes (3 series)
 A Twist of Sand (1968) – David Garland
 Lock Up Your Daughters (1969) – Gossip
 Toomorrow (1970) – John Williams
 The Buttercup Chain (1970) – Martin Carr-Gibbons
 Nicholas and Alexandra (1971) – General Alexeiev
 Tales From The Crypt (1972) – Charles Gregory (segment 4 "Wish You Were Here")
 Hide and Seek (1972) – Mr Grimes
 Clochemerle (1972) - Curé Ponosse
 Space: 1999 (1975, TV series) – Commissioner Simmonds
 Dickens of London (1976, TV series) – Charles Dickens/Mr John Dickens
 Sykes (1976, TV series|Squatters) – The Tramp
 Saturn 3 (1980, voice overdub of Harvey Keitel) – Benson (voice, uncredited)
 Magnum, P.I. (1981, Tropical Madness) - Harcourt
 Family Reunion (1981) – Lester Frye
 Cheech & Chong's The Corsican Brothers (1984) – The Evil Fuckaire/Ye Old Jailer
 Amadeus (1984) – Leopold Mozart
 Eliminators (1986) – Abbott Reeves
 Shaka Zulu (1986, TV series)
 The Wizard (1986, TV series) – Troyan
 Faerie Tale Theatre: "The Dancing Princesses" and "Rip Van Winkle" (1987, TV series) – The King/Peter Vanderdonk
 Beauty and the Beast (1987–90, TV series) – Jacob "Father" 
 Suburban Commando (1991) – Zanuck
 The Cutting Edge (1992) – Anton Pamchenko
 Picket Fences (1992–1995, TV series) – Father Gary Barrett
 Going to Extremes (1992, TV series) – Doctor Croft
 Children of the Dark (1994, TV) – Dr Burnham
 Swimming with Sharks (1994) – Cyrus Miles
 Babylon 5: "The Fall of Night" (1995, TV) – Frederick Lantz
 The Scarlet Letter (1995) – Rev Thomas Cheever
 Mr. & Mrs. Smith (1996; TV series) – Mr Big
 Like Father, Like Santa (1998 TV series) – Ambrose Booth
 Sliders (1999, TV series) – Marc LeBeau/The Seer/Archibald Chandler
 Madigan Men (2000, TV series) – Seamus Madigan
 Alien Hunter (2003) – Dr John Bachman
 Angel (2003, TV series) – Roger Wyndam-Pryce
 Life Begins (2004; TV series)
 La Femme Musketeer (2004, TV mini-series) – Commander Finot
 These Foolish Things (2006) – Lord Carter
 Played (2006) – Jack Rawlings
 Go Go Tales (2007) – Jay
 Hellboy II: The Golden Army (2008) – King Balor
 Game of Thrones (2012, TV series) – Hallyne

Sources:

Voice acting

 Watership Down (audiobook)
 Robin Hood (TV series)
 The Prince and the Pauper (audio book)
 Batman: The Animated Series: "The Lion and the Unicorn" as Frederick
 Spider-Man (TV series) as Keene Marlow/The Destroyer
 The Book of Ebenezer Le Page (audio book)
 The Death Gate Cycle Vol. 4: Serpent Mage (audio book)
 A Song of Ice and Fire series (audio books)

Sources:

Honours
He was appointed an Officer of the Order of the British Empire (OBE) in the 2008 New Year Honours.

References

External links
 
 Oxford Dictionary of National Biography, Roy Dotrice
 
 
 
 
 Selected Performances at the Theatre Archive, University of Bristol
 Two Old Stagers Find Vigour in Brief Lives
 Roy Dotrice(Aveleyman)

1923 births
2017 deaths
20th-century British male actors
21st-century British male actors
Alumni of RADA
Audiobook narrators
Best Actor BAFTA Award (television) winners
British male film actors
British male radio actors
British male stage actors
British male television actors
British male voice actors
British World War II prisoners of war
Drama Desk Award winners
Guernsey male actors
Officers of the Order of the British Empire
Royal Air Force airmen
Royal Air Force personnel of World War II
Royal Shakespeare Company members
Shot-down aviators
Tony Award winners
World War II prisoners of war held by Germany